Mouse warping is a facility provided by some window managers that automatically positions the pointer to the centre of the current application window when the application is made current.

Window managers that support mouse warping 

 afterstep
 awesome
 wmii

User interface techniques